Dennis Lydell (c. 1657-1717), of Wakehurst Place, Sussex, and Crutched Friars, London, was an English Member of Parliament.

He was a Member (MP) of the Parliament of England for Harwich from February 1701 to 1702.

References

1650s births
1717 deaths
Year of birth uncertain
18th-century English people
People from Sussex
People from London